Jean Dalibard (born 8 December 1958) is a French physicist, Professor at the École Polytechnique, member of the French Academy of Sciences and a researcher at the École Normale Supérieure. In 2009, Dalibard received the Blaise Pascal medal of the European Academy of Sciences for "his outstanding and influential works in atomic physics and quantum optics". In 2012, he received the Max Born Award and Davisson–Germer Prize. He was elected an international member of the American Philosophical Society in 2018. In 2020, he was honoured to be an international member of the National Academy of Sciences.

See also 
 Quantum jump method

References

External links

Lectures 
Mécanique quantique
Physique quantique et statistique

1958 births
Living people
Research directors of the French National Centre for Scientific Research
École Normale Supérieure alumni
Pierre and Marie Curie University alumni
Academic staff of École Polytechnique
French physicists
Members of the French Academy of Sciences
Members of the American Philosophical Society
Foreign associates of the National Academy of Sciences
Fellows of the American Physical Society